Pharnaciini is a tribe of notably large stick insects.

Genera
 Baculonistria Hennemann & Conle, 2008
 Pharnacia Stål, 1877
 Phobaeticus Brunner von Wattenwyl, 1907
 Phryganistria Stål, 1875
 Tirachoidea Brunner von Wattenwyl, 1893

External links
 Phasmid Study Group: Pharmnaciini
 Phasmida Tribe File: Pharnaciini

Phasmatidae
Phasmatodea tribes